D. Francisco I de Saldanha da Gama (20 May 1723 – 1 November 1776) was the third Cardinal Patriarch of Lisbon.

Life 
He was the great-grandson of Margarida de Vilhena and a descendant of the first viscount of Vila Nova de Cerveira, Leonel de Lima. His father was João de Saldanha da Gama (1674–1752), forty-first viceroy of India. He studied canon law at Coimbra and was ordained to the Priesthood in 1739. He was created Cardinal by Pope Benedict XIV in 1756 at the request of Joseph I of Portugal. He was named Patriarch of Lisbon on 25 July 1758 and was consecrated to the Episcopate on 5 August 1759.

On 1 April 1758, a brief was obtained from the aged Pope Benedict XIV, appointing Saldanha, recommended by the Marquis of Pombal, to investigate allegations against the Jesuits that had been raised in the name of Joseph I of Portugal.

References

18th-century Portuguese cardinals
Portuguese nobility
1723 births
1776 deaths
University of Coimbra alumni